Santeetlah may refer to:

Lake Santeetlah, a body of water in North Carolina, U.S.
Lake Santeetlah, North Carolina, U.S., a town
Santeetlah dam, a reservoir and dam development project in North Carolina, U.S.